Rodas is a municipality and town in the Cienfuegos Province of Cuba. It was founded in 1859 under the name of Lechuzo. In 1879 it was renamed Rodas in honour of capitán general Caballero de Rodas.

Geography
The municipality is divided into the barrios and villages of Cabecera (the town proper), Ariza, Cartagena, Congojas, Jabacoa, La Unión, Limones, Medidas, Santiago, Soledad and Turquino. Until the 1977 administrative reform, the village of Arriete-Ciego Montero, currently in the municipality of Palmira, was part of it.

It is bordered by the municipalities of Aguada de Pasajeros, Abreus, Cienfuegos, Palmira, Lajas, Santo Domingo (in Villa Clara Province) and Los Arabos (in Matanzas Province).

Demographics
In 2004, the municipality of Rodas had a population of 33,477.

See also
Municipalities of Cuba
List of cities in Cuba

References

External links

Populated places in Cienfuegos Province